David Renton (born 1972) is a British barrister, and has represented clients in a number of high-profile cases, especially concerning trade union rights and the protection of free speech. He was for many years a member of the Socialist Workers Party (SWP). He has published over twenty books on fascism, anti-fascism, and the politics of the left.

Early life and education 
Renton was born in London in 1972. His great aunt was the Communist historian, Dona Torr. His grandfather was the shoe designer Kurt Geiger. One uncle was an activist in Equity, the actors' trade union, while another was the Conservative MP Tim Renton, Baron Renton of Mount Harry. He was educated at all-boys private boarding school Eton College where he became a member of the Labour Party. He then studied history at St John's College, University of Oxford.

Academic career and writing
Renton received his PhD from the University of Sheffield for a thesis on fascism and anti-fascism in Britain after the second world war.

Renton was an academic historian and sociologist, teaching at universities including Nottingham Trent, Edge Hill and Rhodes University and Johannesburg University in South Africa.

His PhD was turned into a book Fascism, Anti-Fascism and the 1940s, and is an account of the interactions between Oswald Mosley's Union Movement, its opponents in the 43 Group, and the police and courts.

Law 
Since 2009, Renton has practised as a barrister at Garden Court Chambers in London, in employment and housing law.

Renton's clients have included the Bank of Ideas and Dave Smith, a construction worker who in 2012 and 2013 sued Carillion (JM) Ltd for blacklisting, in the aftermath of the Consulting Association scandal. Renton represented Smith at the Employment Tribunal, Employment Appeal Tribunal, Court of Appeal and European Court of Human Rights. It was during Smith's Tribunal hearing that the information first came into the public domain that construction workers had been spied on by the police or security services. In 2021, Renton represented Stan Keable of Labour Against the Witchhunt, at the Employment Appeal Tribunal, which held that Keable was unfairly dismissed for events occurring at the "Enough is Enough" protests against Jeremy Corbyn. The EAT upheld an order that Keable should be reinstated.

Politics
Renton joined the Socialist Workers Party in 1991, but  resigned in 2013.

In 2012, Renton was one of the organisers of the 2012 Counter Olympics Network protest against the London Olympics and took part in protests highlighting the Olympics' role in the gentrification of East London.

In 2013, Renton was one of the many SWP members to be caught up in the "Comrade Delta" crisis. Renton supported the female complainants against Martin Smith and became a prominent critic of the SWP leadership, publicly criticising their decisions in a series of posts published on his blog, Lives; Running.

In May 2014, he published a piece in the London Review of Books naming the individual who had been the police's principal suspect for the death of Blair Peach, and setting out deficiencies in the inquest which had prevented the jury from having access to findings of the police investigation in the killing.

Selected publications

1990s
 Red Shirts and Black: Fascists and Anti-Fascists in Oxford in the 1930s. Ruskin College, Oxford, 1996. 
 Fascism: Theory and practice. Pluto Press, London, 1999.

2000s
 Fascism, Anti-Fascism and the 1940s. Palgrave MacMillan, Basingstoke, 2000. 
 Socialism in Liverpool: Episodes in a History of Working-class Struggle. Hegemon Press, 2000. (Editor) 
 The Twentieth Century: A Century of Wars and Revolutions?. Rivers Oram Press, 2000. (edited with Keith Flett) 
 Marx on Globalization. Lawrence and Wishart, London, 2001. (Editor)
 This Rough Game: Fascism and Anti-fascism. Sutton, 2001. 
 Classical Marxism: Socialist Theory and the Second International. New Clarion Press, 2002. 
 The Communist Party of Great Britain Since 1920. Palgrave Macmillan, Basingstoke, 2002. (With James Eaden) 
 New Approaches to Socialist History. New Clarion Press, 2003. (edited with Keith Flett) 
 Dissident Marxism: Past Voices for Present Times. Zed Books, London, 2004. 
 Sidney Pollard: A Life in History. Tauris, London, 2004. 
 Trotsky. Haus Publishing, London, 2004. 
 British Fascism, the Labour Movement and the State. Palgrave Macmillan, Basingstoke, 2005.  (Editor and contributor with Nigel Copsey)
 Colour Blind? Race and Migration in North East England. University of Sunderland Press, Sunderland, 2007. 
 When we Touched the Sky: The Anti-Nazi League 1977-1981. New Clarion Press, 2006. 
 CLR James: Cricket's Philosopher King. Haus Publishing, 2007.
 The Congo: Plunder and Resistance. Zed Books, London, 2007. (With Leo Zeilig and David Seddon)

2010s
 Lives; Running. Zero Books, Winchester, 2012. 
 Struck Out: Why Employment Tribunals Fail Workers and What Can be Done. Pluto Press, London, 2012. 
 Socialism from Below: Writings from an Unfinished Tradition.  Unkant Publishers, 2013. 
 Never Again: Rock Against Racism and the Anti-Nazi League 1976-1982. Routledge, Abingdon, 2018. 
 The New Authoritarians: Convergence on the Right. Pluto Press, London, 2019.

2020s
 Fascism: History and Theory. Pluto Press, London, 2020. 
 Jobs and Homes: Stories of the Law in the Lockdown. Legal Action Group, London, 2021. 
 No Free Speech for Fascists: Exploring 'No Platform' in History, Law and Politics. Routledge, Abingdon, 2021. 
 Labour's Antisemitism Crisis: What the Left Got Wrong and How to Learn From It. Routledge, Abingdon, 2021. 
 Against the Law: Why Justice Requires Fewer Laws and a Smaller State. Repeater, London, 2022. 
 Horatio Bottomley and the Far Right Before Fascism. Routledge, Abingdon, 2022.

References

External links

 Lives Running A blog by Renton

1972 births
Living people
Alumni of St John's College, Oxford
Alumni of the University of Sheffield
British historians
British barristers
British political scientists
Historians of fascism
Lawyers from London
Socialist Workers Party (UK) members
People educated at Eton College
Marxist historians
Historians of communism
English barristers